Summit Avenue Historic District, also known as the Dunleath Historic District and formally as the Charles B. Aycock Historic District, is a national historic district located at Greensboro, Guilford County, North Carolina.  The district encompasses 226 contributing buildings in a middle- and upper-class residential section of Greensboro.  The houses were largely built between the 1890s and 1930s and include notable examples of Queen Anne, Colonial Revival, American Foursquare, and Bungalow / American Craftsman-style architecture. The Sigmund Sternberger House (1926) is listed separately. Other notable buildings include the John C. Clapp House (c. 1900-1905), Robert L. Potts House (c. 1900-1905), William B. Vaught House (c. 1906), Edgar B. Jennette House (c. 1925-1930), and the Charles B. Aycock School (1922) designed by Starrett & van Vleck.

It was listed on the National Register of Historic Places in 1993.

References

External links

Historic districts on the National Register of Historic Places in North Carolina
Colonial Revival architecture in North Carolina
Queen Anne architecture in North Carolina
Buildings and structures in Greensboro, North Carolina
National Register of Historic Places in Guilford County, North Carolina